Miconia aligera is a species of plant in the family Melastomataceae. It is endemic to Peru.

References

Endemic flora of Peru
aligera
Vulnerable plants
Taxonomy articles created by Polbot